Ravindra Narayana Ravi (born 3 April 1952) is an Indian politician and former bureaucrat serving as the current and 15th Governor of Tamil Nadu. Ravi served as the 18th Governor of Nagaland from 1 August 2019 to 9 September 2021 and Governor of Meghalaya from 18 December 2019 to 26 January 2020.

Early life and education
Ravi was born in Patna, Bihar  in a Bhumihar family and completed his Masters in Physics in 1974. After a brief stint in journalism, he joined the Sardar Vallabhbhai Patel National Police Academy in 1976. 

During his tenure in the Central Bureau of Investigation (CBI), Ravi led several anti-corruption crusades against organized criminal gangs, including mining mafias. While serving in the Intelligence Bureau, Ravi was largely involved in theatres of insurgency and violence in Jammu and Kashmir, the North East, and Maoist-affected regions. After retiring from government service in 2012, Ravi wrote regular columns in national newspapers.

Political career 
Ravi was in 2014 appointed the Chairman of the Joint Intelligence Committee. He was appointed  Deputy National Security Advisor of India on 5 October 2018.

He also served as the interlocutor for the talks between NSCN-IM and the Government of India, from 2014 to 2021.

Governor of Nagaland 
Ravi was appointed the Governor of Nagaland on 20 July 2019 by the order of the President of India, Ram Nath Kovind.
The Nagaland Peace Accord between Naga's and Indian government was achieved during his stint in August 2015. It's a major breakthrough for achieving peace in the region since the 1997 ceasefire agreement.

As interlocutor, Ravi had a fallout with the Isak Muivah-led National Socialist Council of Nagaland (NSCN-IM) in 2020 with whom he manoeuvred the signing of the 2015 Framework Agreement after he allegedly misinterpreted the agreement and tried to manipulate it. Subsequently, the NSCN (IM) sought to have him removed as interlocutor. Ravi was also perceived to be targeting the NCSN (IM) group while being soft on its rival Naga National Political Groups comprising seven extremist groups.

After his appointment to Tamil Nadu, the Nationalist Democratic Progressive Party president Chingwang Konyak said the Nagaland government was not happy with the way Ravi functioned and said he interfered in the affairs of a popular government. Journalists of the Kohima Press Club (KPC), boycotted the state farewell programme for Ravi to show their resentment when he was shifted to Tamil Nadu since Ravi refused to interact with the media despite numerous approaches.

Governor of Tamil Nadu
On 9 September 2021, R. N. Ravi was appointed the Governor of Tamil Nadu by President of India Ram Nath Kovind. He took charge as Governor of Tamil Nadu on 18 September 2021. Tamil Nadu Chief Minister M. K. Stalin greeted Ravi and welcomed him. However, his appointment was questioned by Indian National Congress and Viduthalai Chiruthaigal Katchi, allies to the ruling party Dravida Munnetra Kazhagam (DMK) claiming that there is an ulterior motive in his appointment.

The Supreme Court on April 2022 brought into question Ravi's action to refer Rajiv Gandhi assassination convict A. G. Perarivalan's remission plea to the President, saying such a move strikes at the "very roots" of the country's "federal structure."

Ravi had rejected approval for 19 bills passed by the assembly from September 2021 to April 2022 including the anti-NEET bill. Ravi has been criticised by political analysts in Tamilnadu for interfering in the administration of the government. On May 31, 2022, he had 21 bills passed in the Tamil Nadu assembly pending before him.

Ravi on January 2023, suggested that "Tamilagam" would be a more suitable name for Tamil Nadu and mentioned that the ruling political parties have been regressive in the past fifty years. While Ravi's remarks were condemned by the DMK, the opposition party All India Anna Dravida Munnetra Kazhagam, and political leaders from Amma Makkal Munnettra Kazhagam, Marumalarchi Dravida Munnetra Kazhagam and CPI(M), the state unit of BJP supported Ravi. Students from colleges protested against his remarks in many places all over Tamil Nadu.

On January 9, 2023, During the governor speech in the Tamil Nadu Legislative Assembly, Ravi omitted words such as women empowerment, secularism, self respect, compassion and portions on B. R. Ambedkar and Dravidian leaders from the speech submitted by the Government to the Governor's office. It is the convention that the Governor should bound to the prepared speech. M.K. Stalin, the chief minister of Tamil Nadu, moved a resolution requesting that the Speaker to relax rule 17 of the state assembly rules to only record the speech prepared by the state administration and strike out any passages that the governor inserted or omitted. The Assembly passed a resolution that only the Governor's original speech, prepared by the state government and translated by the Speaker, would be documented. RN Ravi then walked off from the Assembly in the middle of Chief minister's speech on the resolution, before the Indian national anthem, which was sung moments later.

References

|-

|-

|-

1952 births
Living people
Governors of Nagaland
People from Bihar